The Loyola Greyhounds men's soccer team represents Loyola University Maryland in NCAA Division I soccer. It became a member of the Patriot League on July 1, 2013. Previously it competed in the Metro Atlantic Athletic Conference (MAAC) from 1989 to 2013. To avoid ambiguity, the team is often referenced as Loyola Maryland or Loyola (MD), as there are two other institutions named Loyola that compete at the Division I level (Loyola-Chicago of Illinois and Loyola-Marymount of California).

The team is one of the most successful athletic programs at Loyola, winning numerous MAAC Championships (both regular season and MAAC Tournament), consistently making NCAA Tournament appearances, and often holding national rankings in both the NSCAA/Adidas Poll as well as that of CollegeSoccerNews. In 1987 the Loyola Men's soccer team was ranked #1 in the nation going into the season.  The team is currently coached by Steve Nichols, a former (class of 1992) Greyhound standout.  Prior to Nichols, the coach was Mark Mettrick, a former youth and reserve player for Manchester United, who had been at the helm since 2000 and had led the Greyhounds to four NCAA Tournament appearances, reaching the Sweet 16 in 2001.  Bill Sento had a strong run prior to Mettrick and lead the team for 20 seasons filled with great success and many Top 10 and Top 20 national rankings.

Loyola won the NCAA Division II Championship in 1976 - one of two national championships in the school's history - and moved up to the Division I level following the conclusion of the 1978 season.

History

Beginnings: 1940–1979
The rich tradition of Loyola Soccer began in 1940 with a simple five game schedule against local opponents; the team's first win did not come until the following season, with a 3-0 victory over local rival Towson University. Loyola's success in its early years was limited; the team had some difficulty in finding a long-term coach and Emil G. Reitz Jr. - the school's head basketball coach - filled the position three separate times on an interim basis.  Loyola did have its first notably successful season in 1962 under the direction of Reitz with a 9-2-2 record, including victories against American, Georgetown, and a 5-0 massacre of local rival Johns Hopkins. Jim was the fourth coach in Loyola's Soccer history, during which he enjoyed fourteen (14) consecutive winning seasons. His team gained four Mason-Dixon Championships and a South Atlantic Regional Championship in 1971 when the Greyhounds enjoy an undefeated season. During his college career Jim scored 20 goals in soccer and he was team captain of both soccer and baseball.
James Bullington, 73, Loyola College soccer coach who led soccer team to NCAA II championship in 1976, died Thursday at Johns Hopkins Hospital of a degenerative disease. The Timonium resident was 73. Mr. Bullington, a Baltimore native, earned his living as president of Harford General Insurance Agency. But his passion was soccer, said his son, James J. Bullington of Lutherville.  "He loved the physicality of it and the fact that you didn't need a lot of equipment to play it," the son said. "He was especially proud of the fact that every player on that championship team was from Baltimore."  Under his leadership, the Greyhounds compiled 15 straight winning seasons. When he retired in 1979, the college—also his alma mater—named him alumnus of the year.   Mr. Bullington grew up in Highlandtown and graduated from Loyola Blakefield before enlisting in the Army in 1946. He was discharged the next year and attended Loyola College on the G.I. Bill. He was captain of the school soccer team and graduated in 1952.  He worked briefly in the music publishing business and played soccer for a short-lived semiprofessional team, the Baltimore Rockets. In 1960, he opened his insurance agency and settled in Timonium soon afterward.  He began his part-time coaching career in 1964 and compiled a career record of 174 wins, 46 losses and eight ties. His 1976 team went 21-1 before defeating New Haven College in the championship game in Seattle.  "There was no ESPN then and it wasn't on the radio, so his oldest son went out with the team and was calling results back to the family in Baltimore," said Mr. Bullington's brother-in-law, William R. Curran of Perry Hall. Mr. Bullington left coaching to devote more time to his family and business, but continued to recruit for the Loyola team. He retired from the insurance business in 1998.

The reign of Sento: 1980–1999
After Bullington retired from coaching following the 1979 season, local coach Bill Sento was hired at the coach of the Greyhounds, and he would lead the team for 20 seasons filled with great success at the NCAA Division I level.  Despite Loyola's relatively small size as a Division I school and the lack of top quality athletic facilities, Sento proved an extremely capable recruiter and was able to bring top-level talent to the Evergreen, including several players such as Bill Heiser and Zach Thornton who had international experience on US youth national teams as well as others from top level club programs throughout the country.

Sento's first season resulted in a 4-9-2 overall record, but that was Loyola's worst during his entire tenure.  In fact, Loyola had only one other losing season under Bill Sento (in 1997).  Sento almost immediately progressed the Loyola men's soccer program onto the national stage.  In 1983, the team finished 17-3-0 including a 4-1 victory against the University of Maryland and finished as ECAC Metro Champions.  Led by players such as the Koziol brothers (Stan and Joe) and Chris Webbert, in 1986 (17-1-4) and 1987 (17-4-2) the Greyhounds went to the NCAA Division I Quarterfinals; both years they beat the University of Virginia (coached by former US National Team manager Bruce Arena) in the tournament and were ranked #1 in the nation going into the 1987 season.

Other successful seasons followed such as 1990 (16-2-5) and 1992 (16-4-1), and in 1993 (19-3-1) the Greyhounds - led by Thornton, Heiser, Mark Harrison, and Bill Wnek - again marched into the NCAA Tournament, this time losing to Virginia 2-1 in the second round after being up 1-0 for most of the game.

Despite other notable campaigns and MAAC Championships, the Greyhounds were unable to replicate the overwhelming successes of the late 1980s and early 1990s, and Sento did not have his contract renewed after the 1999 season despite a strong team with 13-6-2 record and being named MAAC Coach of the Year.  The Sento Era ended with 407 total games played, of which 255 were wins against 112 losses and 40 ties.

Mettrick takes over: 2000–2013

2000–2002

Following the departure of Sento, Loyola initiated a search for a new head soccer coach, receiving interest from several hundred local and national prospects.  Eventually Mark Mettrick was offered the position and in January 2000, became the new head coach of Loyola Soccer.  Mettrick inherited a team that had gone 13-6-2 in the previous campaign, had won the MAAC regular season and was upset in the MAAC Tournament final, so the cupboard certainly was not bare.  Mettrick built the team around its core strengths - goalkeeper Reb Beatty and the defense led by Niall Lepper and Michael Nelson - and led the team to a 12-4-1 record along with a #21 national ranking in his first season. Returning all but one starter in 2001, the Greyhounds were primed for a good season but started off with an incredibly poor performance in a season-opening tournament in California with a loss to the University of California and a tie against Cal St. Fullerton.  However, Loyola turned things around quickly, catalyzed by a 1-0 victory at the University of Maryland, and went on a 19-game unbeaten streak before a loss in the Round of 16 of the NCAA Tournament at St. Louis.  Loyola finished the 2001 season with a record of 17-2-2 and ranked in the Top 10 nationally.  Loyola lost key players for the 2002 season including Nelson, Bobby Von Bremen, and Arturo Lopez, but Beatty and Lepper returned for their senior seasons and led the team to an early season #8 national ranking and an eventual 13-5-3 overall record before falling to Furman in the NCAA Tournament.

2003–2006
From 2003 to 2006, Loyola was unable to continue to build upon the success that Loyola had from 1999–2002, entering a period without an appearance in the national tournament, including back-to-back losing seasons in 2005 and 2006 during one of the worst 2-year periods of Loyola Greyhound soccer since the 1960s.  In 2003 Loyola lost for the first time at home since the 1998 season, but did battle back to make the MAAC Tournament Final narrowly losing to Saint Peters at the Wide World of Sports Complex in Orlando, Florida.  Led by a strong Senior Class, the 2004 Men's Team went 9-0 in MAAC Conference play winning the regular season MAAC Title; but lost to Rider in the Semi-Finals of the MAAC Tournament during a game played in torrential rain and terrible field conditions.  During 2005 and 2006, the team failed to win the regular season MAAC title for the 1st time since 1998 as the team struggled with mediocre talent.

2007–2013

Fortunately Mettrick and the Greyhounds were able to turn things around quickly in 2007, returning to the national stage with a 19-3-1 record, a MAAC Championship, and the team's first NCAA appearance since 2002 that saw the team victorious in a first round match against Liberty before falling to Maryland in penalty kicks.  Led once again by the defense captained by 2007 and 2008 MAAC Defensive Player of the Year Tennant McVea and including goalkeeper Milos Kocic, these Greyhounds demonstrated offensive firepower as well with the likes of Jamie Darvill and Phil Bannister, and the team continued its success in the 2008 campaign, going undefeated in the regular season and earning a ranking as high as #6 in the nation before two upset defeats (in the MAAC final against Fairfield and in the NCAA Second Round against UNC Greensboro) prematurely ended the season.  Loyola is well positioned for a strong start in the 2009 season, with two seniors and one junior named on the 2009 Men's Missouri Athletic Club Hermann Trophy Watch List. In addition to strengthening his non conference matches, Mettrick has called on Crystal Palace Baltimore defender and former Fairfield Stags standout Bryan Harkin as an assistant coach; and former Welsh youth International Gerwyn Jones to anchor his backline.

On November 12, 2013 Loyola University Maryland declined to re-sign Mettrick upon the completion of his contract with the 2013 season.

Players, awards, and recognition

NSCAA Regional All-Americans

NSCAA National All-Americans

CollegeSoccerNews.com National All-Americans

First Team All-Conference

Results by year

All-time school records

Career goals 
 Peter Notaro: 81

Career assists 
 Stan Koziol: 29 
 Mark Harrison: 29

Career points 
 Peter Notaro: 185

Career saves 
 John Houska: 471

Career shutouts 
 Reb Beatty: 43

References

External links
 

 
Soccer clubs in Maryland
Soccer clubs in Baltimore
1940 establishments in Maryland
Association football clubs established in 1940